Rudi van den Abbeele (born 13 November 1952) is a French former Paralympic athlete. He won several medals in para-athletics at the 1988 Summer Paralympics held in Seoul, South Korea.

In 2017, he was elected president of the International Wheelchair and Amputee Sports Federation (IWAS). He is also a recipient of the Paralympic Order.

References

External links 
 

Living people
Place of birth missing (living people)
Paralympic athletes of France
Athletes (track and field) at the 1988 Summer Paralympics
Athletes (track and field) at the 1992 Summer Paralympics
Paralympic gold medalists for France
Paralympic bronze medalists for France
Medalists at the 1988 Summer Paralympics
Paralympic medalists in athletics (track and field)
French pentathletes
French male discus throwers
French male shot putters
Wheelchair discus throwers
Wheelchair shot putters
20th-century French people
21st-century French people
1952 births